Man on the Train is a 2011 crime-drama film directed by Mary McGuckian, starring Donald Sutherland and Larry Mullen Jr. It is an English-language remake of  the 2002 French film L'homme du train, which had been released in the US with the same title as the 2011 version.

Plot
An elderly professor (Sutherland) and a mysterious stranger (Mullen) whom the professor has invited to his house are each very envious of the life of the other.

Production
Filmed in April 2010, it was shot "under the radar" over a 17-day period in the towns of Orangeville and Dundas, Ontario. Because of  Mullen's fame as a member of the rock band U2, there was no publicity surrounding his participation in the project.

References

External links
 

2011 films
2011 crime drama films
Films shot in Ontario
Films set in the United States
English-language Canadian films
English-language Irish films
2010s English-language films
2010s Canadian films
Canadian crime drama films
Irish crime drama films
Remakes of French films